Salsbruket Chapel is a parish church of the Church of Norway in Nærøysund municipality in Trøndelag county, Norway. It is located in the village of Salsbruket. It is one of the churches for the Nærøy parish which is part of the Namdal prosti (deanery) in the Diocese of Nidaros. The white, wooden church was built in a long church style in 1950 using plans drawn up by the architect Arne Sørvig. The church seats about 260 people.  The chapel was consecrated on 27 August 1950 by Bishop Arne Fjellbu.

See also
List of churches in Nidaros

References

Nærøysund
Churches in Trøndelag
Long churches in Norway
Wooden churches in Norway
20th-century Church of Norway church buildings
Churches completed in 1950
1950 establishments in Norway